The Dive from Clausen's Pier is a 2005 Lifetime original film based on an Ann Packer novel directed by Harry Winer and starring Will Estes, Michelle Trachtenberg, and Sean Maher. It premiered on July 25, 2005 on Lifetime.

Mike is a quadriplegic after suffering a major diving accident. His fiancée, Carrie, is not in love with him anymore and is confused and lost after the accident. As a result, she decides to move to Manhattan and away from her small-town life. Along the way she meets a handsome, older man who has problems of his own. Carrie tries to figure out where her place in the world is in a journey of self-discovery.

Many of the characters in the film are in their late teens or early twenties, while in the source novel they are much older. The film also ends on a slightly more optimistic tone than the novel.

The film received a nomination for Outstanding Music Composition for a Miniseries, Movie or a Special (Original Dramatic Score) at the 58th Primetime Emmy Awards in 2006.

Cast
Michelle Trachtenberg as Carrie Beal
Matthew Edison as Simon
Will Estes as Mike Mayer
Kristin Fairlie as Jamie
Sean Maher as Kilroy
Dylan Taylor as Rooster
Susan Counsel as Christine

Filming location
Halifax, Nova Scotia, Canada

References

External links

SeanMaher.info: The Dive From Clausen's Pier

2005 television films
2005 films
2005 drama films
Lifetime (TV network) films
Films based on American novels
Films directed by Harry Winer
Films scored by Bruce Broughton
Films about paraplegics or quadriplegics
2000s English-language films